Hermann Schweppenhäuser (12 March 1928 – 8 April 2015) was a German philosopher and publisher. He was a professor at the Institute for Social Research in Frankfurt am Main, Germany. He publisher over 100 books about world peace and socialism. He was born in Frankfurt am Main.

Schweppenhäuser died in Deutsch Evern, Germany at the age of 87.

References

External links
 Biography 

1928 births
2015 deaths
German philosophers
Academic staff of Goethe University Frankfurt